Barbara Gibson is a Canadian diplomat who served from 2004 to 2008 as the Canadian ambassador to the Organization for Security and Co-operation in Europe in Vienna, in 2015 as Deputy Secretary-General and in 2016 as Secretary-General of the Independent Commission on Multilateralism (ICM) in New York.

Gibson is married to Franz Baumann.

References

Canadian women ambassadors
Living people
Ambassadors of Canada
Year of birth missing (living people)